The 1941 VFL season was the 45th season of the Victorian Football League (VFL), the highest level senior Australian rules football competition in Victoria. The season featured twelve clubs, ran from 26 April until 27 September, and comprised an 18-game home-and-away season followed by a finals series featuring the top four clubs.

The premiership was won by the Melbourne Football Club for the fifth time and third time consecutively, after it defeated  by 29 points in the 1941 VFL Grand Final.

Premiership season
In 1941, the VFL competition consisted of twelve teams of 18 on-the-field players each, plus one substitute player, known as the 19th man. A player could be substituted for any reason; however, once substituted, a player could not return to the field of play under any circumstances.

Teams played each other in a home-and-away season of 18 rounds; matches 12 to 18 were the "home-and-way reverse" of matches 1 to 7.

Once the 18 round home-and-away season had finished, the 1941 VFL Premiers were determined by the specific format and conventions of the Page–McIntyre system.

Round 1

|- bgcolor="#CCCCFF"
| Home team
| Home team score
| Away team
| Away team score
| Venue
| Crowd
| Date
|- bgcolor="#FFFFFF"
| 
| 12.20 (92)
| 
| 12.15 (87)
| Junction Oval
| 15,000
| 26 April 1941
|- bgcolor="#FFFFFF"
| 
| 13.15 (93)
| 
| 7.10 (52)
| Western Oval
| 10,500
| 26 April 1941
|- bgcolor="#FFFFFF"
| 
| 11.11 (77)
| 
| 13.17 (95)
| Victoria Park
| 17,500
| 26 April 1941
|- bgcolor="#FFFFFF"
| 
| 15.12 (102)
| 
| 15.9 (99)
| Princes Park
| 21,000
| 26 April 1941
|- bgcolor="#FFFFFF"
| 
| 15.18 (108)
| 
| 15.17 (107)
| Arden Street Oval
| 8,000
| 26 April 1941
|- bgcolor="#FFFFFF"
| 
| 13.12 (90)
| 
| 17.12 (114)
| MCG
| 14,750
| 26 April 1941

Round 2

|- bgcolor="#CCCCFF"
| Home team
| Home team score
| Away team
| Away team score
| Venue
| Crowd
| Date
|- bgcolor="#FFFFFF"
| 
| 13.9 (87)
| 
| 11.19 (85)
| Kardinia Park
| 8,500
| 3 May 1941
|- bgcolor="#FFFFFF"
| 
| 10.15 (75)
| 
| 16.17 (113)
| Brunswick Street Oval
| 17,000
| 3 May 1941
|- bgcolor="#FFFFFF"
| 
| 22.13 (145)
| 
| 16.12 (108)
| Windy Hill
| 13,000
| 3 May 1941
|- bgcolor="#FFFFFF"
| 
| 13.15 (93)
| 
| 14.17 (101)
| Lake Oval
| 12,000
| 3 May 1941
|- bgcolor="#FFFFFF"
| 
| 13.17 (95)
| 
| 17.16 (118)
| Glenferrie Oval
| 9,000
| 3 May 1941
|- bgcolor="#FFFFFF"
| 
| 13.12 (90)
| 
| 12.8 (80)
| Punt Road Oval
| 28,000
| 3 May 1941

Round 3

|- bgcolor="#CCCCFF"
| Home team
| Home team score
| Away team
| Away team score
| Venue
| Crowd
| Date
|- bgcolor="#FFFFFF"
| 
| 13.19 (97)
| 
| 16.12 (108)
| Kardinia Park
| 7,800
| 10 May 1941
|- bgcolor="#FFFFFF"
| 
| 16.4 (100)
| 
| 7.16 (58)
| Western Oval
| 15,000
| 10 May 1941
|- bgcolor="#FFFFFF"
| 
| 18.12 (120)
| 
| 10.13 (73)
| Princes Park
| 9,000
| 10 May 1941
|- bgcolor="#FFFFFF"
| 
| 18.15 (123)
| 
| 14.11 (95)
| Punt Road Oval
| 13,000
| 10 May 1941
|- bgcolor="#FFFFFF"
| 
| 7.16 (58)
| 
| 16.7 (103)
| Junction Oval
| 19,000
| 10 May 1941
|- bgcolor="#FFFFFF"
| 
| 15.7 (97)
| 
| 18.15 (123)
| Brunswick Street Oval
| 14,000
| 10 May 1941

Round 4

|- bgcolor="#CCCCFF"
| Home team
| Home team score
| Away team
| Away team score
| Venue
| Crowd
| Date
|- bgcolor="#FFFFFF"
| 
| 13.15 (93)
| 
| 13.11 (89)
| MCG
| 13,000
| 17 May 1941
|- bgcolor="#FFFFFF"
| 
| 15.14 (104)
| 
| 14.8 (92)
| Windy Hill
| 20,000
| 17 May 1941
|- bgcolor="#FFFFFF"
| 
| 14.11 (95)
| 
| 14.10 (94)
| Victoria Park
| 16,000
| 17 May 1941
|- bgcolor="#FFFFFF"
| 
| 13.16 (94)
| 
| 11.13 (79)
| Glenferrie Oval
| 6,000
| 17 May 1941
|- bgcolor="#FFFFFF"
| 
| 15.19 (109)
| 
| 12.10 (82)
| Lake Oval
| 10,500
| 17 May 1941
|- bgcolor="#FFFFFF"
| 
| 15.15 (105)
| 
| 16.23 (119)
| Arden Street Oval
| 14,000
| 17 May 1941

Round 5

|- bgcolor="#CCCCFF"
| Home team
| Home team score
| Away team
| Away team score
| Venue
| Crowd
| Date
|- bgcolor="#FFFFFF"
| 
| 14.12 (96)
| 
| 13.25 (103)
| Kardinia Park
| 6,000
| 31 May 1941
|- bgcolor="#FFFFFF"
| 
| 14.21 (105)
| 
| 8.8 (56)
| Western Oval
| 12,000
| 31 May 1941
|- bgcolor="#FFFFFF"
| 
| 19.13 (127)
| 
| 26.11 (167)
| Victoria Park
| 15,000
| 31 May 1941
|- bgcolor="#FFFFFF"
| 
| 17.18 (120)
| 
| 15.8 (98)
| Punt Road Oval
| 13,000
| 31 May 1941
|- bgcolor="#FFFFFF"
| 
| 8.12 (60)
| 
| 23.18 (156)
| Glenferrie Oval
| 10,000
| 31 May 1941
|- bgcolor="#FFFFFF"
| 
| 13.12 (90)
| 
| 15.18 (108)
| Junction Oval
| 15,000
| 31 May 1941

Round 6

|- bgcolor="#CCCCFF"
| Home team
| Home team score
| Away team
| Away team score
| Venue
| Crowd
| Date
|- bgcolor="#FFFFFF"
| 
| 17.12 (114)
| 
| 8.14 (62)
| Arden Street Oval
| 6,500
| 7 June 1941
|- bgcolor="#FFFFFF"
| 
| 20.12 (132)
| 
| 14.20 (104)
| Western Oval
| 16,000
| 7 June 1941
|- bgcolor="#FFFFFF"
| 
| 17.14 (116)
| 
| 10.15 (75)
| Brunswick Street Oval
| 7,000
| 7 June 1941
|- bgcolor="#FFFFFF"
| 
| 13.21 (99)
| 
| 11.16 (82)
| Princes Park
| 18,500
| 7 June 1941
|- bgcolor="#FFFFFF"
| 
| 17.15 (117)
| 
| 8.14 (62)
| Punt Road Oval
| 8,500
| 7 June 1941
|- bgcolor="#FFFFFF"
| 
| 8.13 (61)
| 
| 13.18 (96)
| Lake Oval
| 15,000
| 7 June 1941

Round 7

|- bgcolor="#CCCCFF"
| Home team
| Home team score
| Away team
| Away team score
| Venue
| Crowd
| Date
|- bgcolor="#FFFFFF"
| 
| 6.20 (56)
| 
| 13.12 (90)
| Glenferrie Oval
| 7,000
| 14 June 1941
|- bgcolor="#FFFFFF"
| 
| 10.14 (74)
| 
| 10.15 (75)
| Kardinia Park
| 7,000
| 14 June 1941
|- bgcolor="#FFFFFF"
| 
| 9.24 (78)
| 
| 4.12 (36)
| Windy Hill
| 14,000
| 14 June 1941
|- bgcolor="#FFFFFF"
| 
| 17.19 (121)
| 
| 16.15 (111)
| Victoria Park
| 10,000
| 14 June 1941
|- bgcolor="#FFFFFF"
| 
| 15.14 (104)
| 
| 9.8 (62)
| Junction Oval
| 20,000
| 14 June 1941
|- bgcolor="#FFFFFF"
| 
| 14.13 (97)
| 
| 19.10 (124)
| MCG
| 29,000
| 16 June 1941

Round 8

|- bgcolor="#CCCCFF"
| Home team
| Home team score
| Away team
| Away team score
| Venue
| Crowd
| Date
|- bgcolor="#FFFFFF"
| 
| 10.13 (73)
| 
| 6.11 (47)
| Punt Road Oval
| 6,000
| 21 June 1941
|- bgcolor="#FFFFFF"
| 
| 6.8 (44)
| 
| 12.12 (84)
| Glenferrie Oval
| 2,000
| 21 June 1941
|- bgcolor="#FFFFFF"
| 
| 8.12 (60)
| 
| 7.10 (52)
| Victoria Park
| 6,000
| 21 June 1941
|- bgcolor="#FFFFFF"
| 
| 10.17 (77)
| 
| 12.13 (85)
| Princes Park
| 4,000
| 21 June 1941
|- bgcolor="#FFFFFF"
| 
| 8.16 (64)
| 
| 6.6 (42)
| Lake Oval
| 5,000
| 21 June 1941
|- bgcolor="#FFFFFF"
| 
| 10.18 (78)
| 
| 13.15 (93)
| Kardinia Park
| 5,000
| 21 June 1941

Round 9

|- bgcolor="#CCCCFF"
| Home team
| Home team score
| Away team
| Away team score
| Venue
| Crowd
| Date
|- bgcolor="#FFFFFF"
| 
| 15.13 (103)
| 
| 9.16 (70)
| Punt Road Oval
| 15,000
| 28 June 1941
|- bgcolor="#FFFFFF"
| 
| 21.19 (145)
| 
| 10.20 (80)
| Brunswick Street Oval
| 7,000
| 28 June 1941
|- bgcolor="#FFFFFF"
| 
| 18.12 (120)
| 
| 11.13 (79)
| Windy Hill
| 10,000
| 28 June 1941
|- bgcolor="#FFFFFF"
| 
| 17.14 (116)
| 
| 20.9 (129)
| Arden Street Oval
| 5,000
| 28 June 1941
|- bgcolor="#FFFFFF"
| 
| 12.11 (83)
| 
| 16.10 (106)
| Junction Oval
| 16,000
| 28 June 1941
|- bgcolor="#FFFFFF"
| 
| 12.14 (86)
| 
| 15.11 (101)
| Western Oval
| 21,000
| 28 June 1941

Round 10

|- bgcolor="#CCCCFF"
| Home team
| Home team score
| Away team
| Away team score
| Venue
| Crowd
| Date
|- bgcolor="#FFFFFF"
| 
| 12.13 (85)
| 
| 14.11 (95)
| Western Oval
| 14,000
| 5 July 1941
|- bgcolor="#FFFFFF"
| 
| 10.12 (72)
| 
| 11.13 (79)
| Victoria Park
| 7,500
| 5 July 1941
|- bgcolor="#FFFFFF"
| 
| 12.25 (97)
| 
| 13.11 (89)
| Princes Park
| 7,000
| 5 July 1941
|- bgcolor="#FFFFFF"
| 
| 13.20 (98)
| 
| 6.14 (50)
| Arden Street Oval
| 3,000
| 5 July 1941
|- bgcolor="#FFFFFF"
| 
| 12.4 (76)
| 
| 12.6 (78)
| Junction Oval
| 7,000
| 5 July 1941
|- bgcolor="#FFFFFF"
| 
| 16.17 (113)
| 
| 9.11 (65)
| MCG
| 17,000
| 5 July 1941

Round 11

|- bgcolor="#CCCCFF"
| Home team
| Home team score
| Away team
| Away team score
| Venue
| Crowd
| Date
|- bgcolor="#FFFFFF"
| 
| 14.24 (108)
| 
| 8.13 (61)
| MCG
| 21,000
| 12 July 1941
|- bgcolor="#FFFFFF"
| 
| 13.12 (90)
| 
| 9.15 (69)
| Glenferrie Oval
| 4,000
| 12 July 1941
|- bgcolor="#FFFFFF"
| 
| 18.15 (123)
| 
| 18.16 (124)
| Brunswick Street Oval
| 8,000
| 12 July 1941
|- bgcolor="#FFFFFF"
| 
| 15.14 (104)
| 
| 9.11 (65)
| Windy Hill
| 15,000
| 12 July 1941
|- bgcolor="#FFFFFF"
| 
| 7.16 (58)
| 
| 14.12 (96)
| Kardinia Park
| 7,500
| 12 July 1941
|- bgcolor="#FFFFFF"
| 
| 16.13 (109)
| 
| 14.9 (93)
| Lake Oval
| 14,000
| 12 July 1941

Round 12

|- bgcolor="#CCCCFF"
| Home team
| Home team score
| Away team
| Away team score
| Venue
| Crowd
| Date
|- bgcolor="#FFFFFF"
| 
| 13.21 (99)
| 
| 14.11 (95)
| Kardinia Park
| 4,500
| 19 July 1941
|- bgcolor="#FFFFFF"
| 
| 16.8 (104)
| 
| 18.18 (126)
| Brunswick Street Oval
| 8,000
| 19 July 1941
|- bgcolor="#FFFFFF"
| 
| 14.12 (96)
| 
| 8.6 (54)
| Lake Oval
| 10,000
| 19 July 1941
|- bgcolor="#FFFFFF"
| 
| 11.14 (80)
| 
| 15.12 (102)
| Glenferrie Oval
| 5,000
| 19 July 1941
|- bgcolor="#FFFFFF"
| 
| 10.14 (74)
| 
| 13.14 (92)
| Punt Road Oval
| 15,000
| 19 July 1941
|- bgcolor="#FFFFFF"
| 
| 12.11 (83)
| 
| 18.14 (122)
| Windy Hill
| 14,000
| 19 July 1941

Round 13

|- bgcolor="#CCCCFF"
| Home team
| Home team score
| Away team
| Away team score
| Venue
| Crowd
| Date
|- bgcolor="#FFFFFF"
| 
| 18.16 (124)
| 
| 10.13 (73)
| MCG
| 23,000
| 26 July 1941
|- bgcolor="#FFFFFF"
| 
| 22.20 (152)
| 
| 12.13 (85)
| Victoria Park
| 4,000
| 26 July 1941
|- bgcolor="#FFFFFF"
| 
| 12.11 (83)
| 
| 11.18 (84)
| Princes Park
| 27,000
| 26 July 1941
|- bgcolor="#FFFFFF"
| 
| 18.14 (122)
| 
| 11.15 (81)
| Junction Oval
| 4,000
| 26 July 1941
|- bgcolor="#FFFFFF"
| 
| 15.20 (110)
| 
| 9.4 (58)
| Western Oval
| 10,000
| 26 July 1941
|- bgcolor="#FFFFFF"
| 
| 12.14 (86)
| 
| 17.8 (110)
| Arden Street Oval
| 10,000
| 26 July 1941

Round 14

|- bgcolor="#CCCCFF"
| Home team
| Home team score
| Away team
| Away team score
| Venue
| Crowd
| Date
|- bgcolor="#FFFFFF"
| 
| 9.10 (64)
| 
| 10.7 (67)
| Arden Street Oval
| 10,000
| 2 August 1941
|- bgcolor="#FFFFFF"
| 
| 16.17 (113)
| 
| 6.13 (49)
| Windy Hill
| 10,000
| 2 August 1941
|- bgcolor="#FFFFFF"
| 
| 11.9 (75)
| 
| 8.9 (57)
| Victoria Park
| 9,000
| 2 August 1941
|- bgcolor="#FFFFFF"
| 
| 19.14 (128)
| 
| 9.18 (72)
| MCG
| 7,000
| 2 August 1941
|- bgcolor="#FFFFFF"
| 
| 7.13 (55)
| 
| 10.21 (81)
| Lake Oval
| 20,000
| 2 August 1941
|- bgcolor="#FFFFFF"
| 
| 11.15 (81)
| 
| 16.25 (121)
| Glenferrie Oval
| 7,500
| 2 August 1941

Round 15

|- bgcolor="#CCCCFF"
| Home team
| Home team score
| Away team
| Away team score
| Venue
| Crowd
| Date
|- bgcolor="#FFFFFF"
| 
| 22.12 (144)
| 
| 19.15 (129)
| Kardinia Park
| 4,500
| 9 August 1941
|- bgcolor="#FFFFFF"
| 
| 16.17 (113)
| 
| 11.14 (80)
| Brunswick Street Oval
| 8,000
| 9 August 1941
|- bgcolor="#FFFFFF"
| 
| 25.19 (169)
| 
| 17.15 (117)
| Princes Park
| 10,000
| 9 August 1941
|- bgcolor="#FFFFFF"
| 
| 12.13 (85)
| 
| 14.17 (101)
| Junction Oval
| 7,000
| 9 August 1941
|- bgcolor="#FFFFFF"
| 
| 14.11 (95)
| 
| 12.16 (88)
| Punt Road Oval
| 26,000
| 9 August 1941
|- bgcolor="#FFFFFF"
| 
| 7.10 (52)
| 
| 10.21 (81)
| Western Oval
| 16,000
| 9 August 1941

Round 16

|- bgcolor="#CCCCFF"
| Home team
| Home team score
| Away team
| Away team score
| Venue
| Crowd
| Date
|- bgcolor="#FFFFFF"
| 
| 14.15 (99)
| 
| 12.16 (88)
| Brunswick Street Oval
| 11,000
| 16 August 1941
|- bgcolor="#FFFFFF"
| 
| 19.17 (131)
| 
| 14.9 (93)
| Windy Hill
| 7,000
| 16 August 1941
|- bgcolor="#FFFFFF"
| 
| 20.17 (137)
| 
| 11.14 (80)
| Princes Park
| 8,000
| 16 August 1941
|- bgcolor="#FFFFFF"
| 
| 10.10 (70)
| 
| 10.9 (69)
| Lake Oval
| 4,000
| 16 August 1941
|- bgcolor="#FFFFFF"
| 
| 15.14 (104)
| 
| 11.22 (88)
| Arden Street Oval
| 8,000
| 16 August 1941
|- bgcolor="#FFFFFF"
| 
| 17.8 (110)
| 
| 11.21 (87)
| MCG
| 31,000
| 16 August 1941

Round 17

|- bgcolor="#CCCCFF"
| Home team
| Home team score
| Away team
| Away team score
| Venue
| Crowd
| Date
|- bgcolor="#FFFFFF"
| 
| 8.12 (60)
| 
| 18.22 (130)
| Glenferrie Oval
| 8,000
| 23 August 1941
|- bgcolor="#FFFFFF"
| 
| 12.23 (95)
| 
| 7.4 (46)
| Windy Hill
| 9,000
| 23 August 1941
|- bgcolor="#FFFFFF"
| 
| 16.18 (114)
| 
| 21.10 (136)
| Junction Oval
| 6,000
| 23 August 1941
|- bgcolor="#FFFFFF"
| 
| 17.20 (122)
| 
| 16.9 (105)
| MCG
| 12,000
| 23 August 1941
|- bgcolor="#FFFFFF"
| 
| 13.16 (94)
| 
| 16.13 (109)
| Kardinia Park
| 4,500
| 23 August 1941
|- bgcolor="#FFFFFF"
| 
| 10.21 (81)
| 
| 11.17 (83)
| Victoria Park
| 30,000
| 23 August 1941

Round 18

|- bgcolor="#CCCCFF"
| Home team
| Home team score
| Away team
| Away team score
| Venue
| Crowd
| Date
|- bgcolor="#FFFFFF"
| 
| 16.14 (110)
| 
| 13.17 (95)
| Western Oval
| 7,000
| 30 August 1941
|- bgcolor="#FFFFFF"
| 
| 16.17 (113)
| 
| 11.22 (88)
| Princes Park
| 29,000
| 30 August 1941
|- bgcolor="#FFFFFF"
| 
| 7.12 (54)
| 
| 11.17 (83)
| Lake Oval
| 3,000
| 30 August 1941
|- bgcolor="#FFFFFF"
| 
| 20.12 (132)
| 
| 12.11 (83)
| Punt Road Oval
| 9,000
| 30 August 1941
|- bgcolor="#FFFFFF"
| 
| 15.16 (106)
| 
| 18.14 (122)
| Brunswick Street Oval
| 11,000
| 30 August 1941
|- bgcolor="#FFFFFF"
| 
| 12.8 (80)
| 
| 13.20 (98)
| Arden Street Oval
| 5,000
| 30 August 1941

Ladder

Finals

Semi finals

|- bgcolor="#CCCCFF"
| Home team
| Score
| Away team
| Score
| Venue
| Crowd
| Date
|- bgcolor="#FFFFFF"
| 
| 11.15 (81)
| 
| 21.9 (135)
| MCG
| 57,741
| 6 September
|- bgcolor="#FFFFFF"
| 
| 11.16 (82)
| 
| 16.13 (109)
| MCG
| 59,435
| 13 September

Preliminary Final

|- bgcolor="#CCCCFF"
| Home team
| Score
| Away team
| Score
| Venue
| Crowd
| Date
|- bgcolor="#FFFFFF"
| 
| 9.14 (68)
| 
| 13.15 (93)
| MCG
| 65,105
| 20 September

Grand final

Melbourne defeated Essendon 19.13 (127) to 13.20 (98), in front of a crowd of 79,687 people. (For an explanation of scoring see Australian rules football).

Awards
 The 1941 VFL Premiership team was Melbourne.
 The VFL's leading goalkicker was Sel Murray of North Melbourne with 88 goals.
 The winner of the 1941 Brownlow Medal was Norman Ware of Footscray with 23 votes. He was the only playing coach to achieve the feat.
 Hawthorn took the "wooden spoon" in 1941.
Essendon 12.16 (88) defeated  9.17 (71) in the Grand Final, played as a curtain-raiser to the senior Grand Final on Saturday 27 September at the Melbourne Cricket Ground.

Notable events
 Owing to the military takeover of Corio Oval, Geelong moved its home games to Kardinia Park.
During March, the players of the Geelong Football Club went on strike and refused to train over a pay dispute. The players were seeking £3 per week, but the club was offering £1/10/– per week, which upset the players as they had received pay cuts in 1940 (from £3 to £1) when the club had made the finals and finished the year in a strong financial position. In response, the club claimed the lower offer was due to the extra expense of moving from Corio Oval to Kardinia Park, and increased payments to war funds drove the decision. The majority of players acquiesced and accepted the £1/10/– offer, but five senior players did not. Three of those crossed to the Victorian Football Association without a clearance – Allan Everett going to Preston, Bernie Hore going to Coburg, and Alan "Nipper" Marsham to Williamstown – while the other two, George Dougherty and Tom Arklay, having trained in the pre-season with the VFA clubs Coburg and Preston (respectively), eventually returned to play with Geelong in the 1941 season.
 In the Round 2 match between Carlton and Richmond, 11 players were injured, while highly talented Carlton rover Jack Hale, who broke his leg in an accidental collision with Richmond centreman Bernie Waldron, never played again.
 The VFL postponed its Round 5 matches and conducted its second patriotic lightning carnival at the Melbourne Cricket Ground on Saturday 24 May 1941. Collingwood won the carnival, defeating Melbourne 3.2 (20) to 3.1 (19). The carnival raised £1,526 for the war effort.
 On 31 July 1941, Melbourne rover Ron Barassi Sr. was killed in action at the Siege of Tobruk. He was the first VFL player to be killed in the Second World War. On 16 August 1941, a brief, moving memorial tribute to Barassi was conducted (including a bugler playing "The Last Post") at the Melbourne Cricket Club by spectators, players, trainers, and officials of Melbourne and Collingwood.
 In the last minutes of the last quarter of the Second Eighteens Grand Final, played at the MCG on 27 September 1941, which Essendon, captain-coached ex-Collingwood player Harry Collier, won (beating Fitzroy 12.16 (88) to 9.17 (71)), a Fitzroy player felled an Essendon player and fights broke out all over the ground. As the final bell was sounding, a vicious bench-clearing brawl broke out involving almost every player, with many of the players felled by punches and kicks. Both teams were reported for "unseemly conduct", and following the VFL investigation committee's hearing conducted on 14 October 1941, each club was fined £10.
 In a lop-sided senior Grand Final, Melbourne, missing at least twelve of its 1941 senior players through either injury or military service, was 47 points ahead at three quarter time, and went on to beat Essendon by 29 points: 19.13 (127) to 13.20 (98).
 After defeating Collingwood in Round 5, Carlton had a winning record over every other team in the competition in combined regular season and finals matches. They would hold this distinction until Round 8 of the 1954 VFL season.

See also
 The VFL during the World Wars
 1916 VFL season

Footnotes

References
 Hogan, P., The Tigers of Old, The Richmond Football Club, (Richmond), 1996. 
 Maplestone, M., Flying Higher: History of the Essendon Football Club 1872–1996, Essendon Football Club, (Melbourne), 1996. 
 Rogers, S. & Brown, A., Every Game Ever Played: VFL/AFL Results 1897–1997 (Sixth Edition), Viking Books, (Ringwood), 1998. 
 Ross, J. (ed), 100 Years of Australian Football 1897–1996: The Complete Story of the AFL, All the Big Stories, All the Great Pictures, All the Champions, Every AFL Season Reported, Viking, (Ringwood), 1996.

External links
 1941 Season – AFL Tables

Australian Football League seasons
Season